Targionia is a genus of liverworts in the order  Marchantiales.  It the only genus in the family  Targioniaceae within that order.   This genus has worldwide distribution in areas with a Mediterranean climate. That is, in regions with hot dry summers and cool wet winters.

Species in Targionia 
 Targionia elongata
 Targionia hypophylla
 Targionia lorbeeriana
 Targionia stellaris

References 

Marchantiales
Marchantiales genera